Dadieshui Waterfall, is a waterfall in China located on the Bajiang River (巴江) in Kunming, Yunnan province. Dadieshui Waterfall is the largest waterfall in Yunnan, also is "the first waterfall on Pearl River".

The waterfall also is a viewfinder of the movie The Myth, a scene which Jackie Chan jump down to waterfall.

References

Waterfalls of China
Geography of Kunming
Tourist attractions in Kunming